A by-election was held for the New South Wales Legislative Assembly electorate of Mudgee on 6 May 1887 because of the resignation of Adolphus Taylor to become the Examiner of Patents.

Dates

Results

Adolphus Taylor resigned to become the Examiner of Patents.

See also
Electoral results for the district of Mudgee
List of New South Wales state by-elections

References

1887 elections in Australia
New South Wales state by-elections
1880s in New South Wales